Mercury oxycyanide is a chemical compound, an organomercury derivative. It is both explosive and highly toxic, producing symptoms of both mercury and cyanide poisoning following exposure.

See also 
 Cacodyl cyanide
 Mercury(II) cyanide

References 

Organomercury compounds
Nitriles